Port-le-Grand is a commune in the Somme department in Hauts-de-France in northern France.

Geography

History
It is considered the birthplace of Saint Honorius of Amiens (d. 600 AD). From time immemorial it was the site of a ferry to cross the river. As Portus Icius it is mentioned in the vita of Saint Austreberthe, whose name is reflected in the small River Austreberthe.

Population

See also
Communes of the Somme department

References

Communes of Somme (department)